Carnglaze Caverns consists of three man-made caverns formed as part of a slate quarry in the Loveny Valley, near the village of St Neot, Liskeard, Cornwall, England, UK.

The first of the caverns, the Rum Store, is so called because it was used by the Royal Navy during the Second World War to store its supply of rum. In 2001 it was converted into an auditorium with seating for 400.

The lowest of the three caverns has a lake, which was where the cover image for Echo & the Bunnymen's LP Ocean Rain was shot.

The caverns have been used as an unusual concert venue, with performances from folk-rock artists such as Fish and Fairport Convention, as well as bands such as Embrace (in 2004), and British Sea Power (in 2005 and 2007). The site has also hosted craft and mineral shows.

References

External links

 Official website

Slate mines in England
Buildings and structures in Cornwall
Tourist attractions in Cornwall
Music venues in Cornwall
Mining in Cornwall
Caves of Cornwall
Industrial archaeological sites in Cornwall